Archery was competed at the 2006 Asian Games in Doha, Qatar. Men and women competed in both individual and team events with all competition taking place at the Lusail Archery Range from December 9 through December 13.

The competition included only recurve events.

Schedule

Medalists

Medal table

Participating nations
A total of 119 athletes from 22 nations competed in archery at the 2006 Asian Games:

References

Official Results

External links
Official website

 
2006
Asian Games
2006 Asian Games events